Jože Kolman (born 5 February 1967) is a Slovenian gymnast. He competed at the 1988 Summer Olympics and the 1992 Summer Olympics.

References

1967 births
Living people
Slovenian male artistic gymnasts
Olympic gymnasts of Yugoslavia
Olympic gymnasts of Slovenia
Gymnasts at the 1988 Summer Olympics
Gymnasts at the 1992 Summer Olympics
Sportspeople from Ljubljana
Originators of elements in artistic gymnastics